Laney College is a public community college in Oakland, California. Laney is the largest of the four colleges of the Peralta Community College District which serves northern Alameda County. Laney College is named after Joseph Clarence Laney. The college offers both certificates and credits for Associate of Arts degree, as well as prerequisites to transfer to four year universities. It is accredited by the Accrediting Commission for Community and Junior Colleges.

History
Laney College traces its history to the Central Trade School by the Oakland Board of the Education in 1927 and the Merritt School of Business (now Merritt College) founded in 1929. The trade school was later renamed Joseph C. Laney Trade and Technical Institute. Oakland Junior College was founded in 1953 with Laney serving as the vocational training center and Merritt hosting the liberal arts and business programs. In 1958, the college was renamed Oakland City College. With the establishment of the Peralta Junior College District in 1964, Laney Institute, located on the current campus, and Merritt College became separate autonomous colleges in their present-day forms. The current campus was opened prior to the 1970-71 academic year.

Campus
Most of the college's academic and administrative buildings are clustered together in a complex in the northern corner of the campus. The buildings are arranged on a rigid grid, with two levels of concrete pathways providing circulation.  The square in the center of the complex has been reserved for the quad. Surrounding the quad are the student center, theater, library, and gymnasium. On one corner is the triangular "Laney Tower", the main administration building; on the opposite is another triangular building housing a lecture hall and dance studio. Academic buildings form the outer ring of the complex. Each has a similar design, with outdoor courtyards in the centers of each square on a higher level, ringed by classrooms and offices; and more classrooms and vocational facilities on the lower level, all accessed from the perimeter of the building. However, none of the higher levels are on the same level as each other; they are connected by voluminous stairs and ramps. Most of the outer buildings occupy two or three squares on the grid. The entire complex shares a red brick and concrete theme, with sharp corners, square and triangular shapes, and little vegetation.

The newest academic building is the art center, which is adjacent to the main complex but has its own architectural style. The building opened in the 2006-2007 school year. It was designed by Beverly Prior Architects to be built from prefabricated material, because of the short time frame between the start of construction and planned opening.

The channel that connects Lake Merritt to the Oakland Estuary runs through the center of the campus. The southeastern half of the campus on the other side of the channel is mainly used for athletic and Peralta Community College District facilities. This section was also the former site of the World War II "Auditorium Housing Project" which housed war industry workers from around the United States, many of whom worked in the Kaiser Shipyards. The housing was demolished sometime after the war, and in the early 1960s, a temporary football stadium called Frank Youell Field was constructed on the site for use by the Oakland Raiders.

Athletics
In 1960, student Linda Vail won the U.S. Tennis Association national intercollegiate women's tennis championships in both singles and doubles.

Football
The Laney Eagles compete in the Bay 6 Football Conference, which is governed by the California Community College Athletic Association (CCCAA). They are led by head coach John Beam, who has won the CCCAA Coach of the Year award.

In the 2018 season, Laney won the CCCAA State Football Championship and was deemed the Mythical National Champion, due to the regional splits between the CCCAA, which governs all 68 California junior college football programs, and the National Junior College Athletic Association, which governs junior college athletics across the rest of the United States, and covers 65 football programs.

In 2020, Laney Football is featured in season 5 of the Netflix sports series Last Chance U, after which the series will cover junior college basketball programs.

Notable people

Faculty
Carole Ward Allen, professor, ethnic studies
Phil Snow, football coach

Alumni

Oakland City College, Laney campus 
Ron Dellums, U.S. Congressman and mayor of Oakland
Gil Kahele, Hawaii state legislator
Frank Oz, puppeteer, director

Laney College 
Teddy Abrams, orchestral conductor and composer
C. J. Anderson, football player
Seth Bogart, artist and musician
Steve Howard, former MLB player
Chuck Jacobs, football player
Sterling Moore, football player
Reggie Redding, football player
James Robinson, U.S. track champion 800 meters
Tony Sanchez, college football head coach
George Wells, wrestler
Tommy Wiseau, director, actor, producer, screenwriter
Nahshon Wright, football player

See also

 Bay Valley Conference
 Berkeley City College
 College of Alameda
 Merritt College
 KGPC-LP 96.9 FM
 Oakland City University, a similarly named college in Indiana

References

External links
Official website

 
California Community Colleges
Education in Oakland, California
Educational institutions established in 1953
Universities and colleges in Alameda County, California
Schools accredited by the Western Association of Schools and Colleges
1953 establishments in California
Triangular buildings